Blinders On is a 2006 solo album by Sean Watkins. It was released on March 14, 2006. Blinders On is Watkins' third solo album, and his first in three years. The album is not considered bluegrass at all, one critic saying that Blinders On is "pure California road pop".

Track listing
Summer's Coming - 3:32
Starve Them To Death - 2:47
I'm Sorry (Watkins, Wilson) - 4:01
Happy New Year - 4:08
Hello...Goodbye - 1:11
Run Away Girl (Watkins, Wilson) - 3:49
I Say Nothing - 4:00
Coffee - 3:03
The Sound Of My Crush - :50
No Lighted Windows - 2:19
Cammac - :20
Roses Never Red - 2:51
They Sail Away (Frizell, Watkins) - 3:06
Not That Bad/Blinders On - 4:14
Whipping Boy/Cherokee Shuffle (Hidden Track) - 7:11 (Whipping Boy ends at 2:32 and the hidden track begins at 3:05)

All songs by Sean Watkins, except where noted.

Personnel

Musical
Sean Watkins - Lead Vocals, Guitars, Organ, Synthesizer, Bass, Mandolin, Piano, Keyboards, Sampling, Harmony Vocals, Drum Machine, Art Direction, Mixing, Drum Loop
Sara Watkins - Violin, Harmony Vocals
Gabe Witcher - Fiddle
Benmont Tench - Piano, Toy Xylophone, Wurlitzer, Harmonium, Hammond organ
Glenn Kotche - Drums, Vibes
Jon Foreman - Harmony Vocals
Rushad Eggleston - Cello
Peter Sprague - Engineer, Mixing
Byron House - Bass (Pizzicato)
Jon Brion - Piano
Mark Schatz - Bass
Judith Ablon - Viola
Zeneba Bowers - Violin
Matthew Walker - Cello
Duncan Moore - Drums

Technical
Loren Witcher - Cover Art, Illustrations
Ricky Chao - Assistant Engineer
Autumn de Wilde - Photography
Wendy Stamberger - Art Direction, Design
Scott Fritz - Engineer, Mixing
Ray Kennedy - Mastering
Glenn Pittman - Assistant Engineer
Vanessa Price - Grooming

Public reception
The album was well received by fans, although Blinders On did not chart on any of the Billboard listings. It was released by compact disc and also via digital download on Watkins's website (where it remains available for digital download).

References

External links
Sean's website

2006 albums
Sean Watkins albums